Birger Andreassen (31 December 1891 – 25 March 1961) was a Norwegian cyclist. He competed in two events at the 1912 Summer Olympics.

References

External links
 

1891 births
1961 deaths
Norwegian male cyclists
Olympic cyclists of Norway
Cyclists at the 1912 Summer Olympics
Cyclists from Oslo